Horná Mičiná is a village and municipality of the Banská Bystrica District in the Banská Bystrica Region of Slovakia.

History
In historical records, the village was first mentioned in 1293 (1293 terra Myka, 1300 terra comitis Mike, 1309 Lehatha, 1395 Mykelyhotha, Mykofalwa, 1402 Mykefalva, 1446 Micafalw, 1469 Miczinawess, 1521 Mitzina, 1523 Superior Mykelfalwa, 1567 Miczina), when it belonged to Count Mike (Michael). After on, it was possessed by Zvolen. In the 16th century, it belonged to local feudatory Micsinyey, and, later on, to the Benicky family.

People
Ján Chalupka, dramatist

References

External links
https://web.archive.org/web/20080111223415/http://www.statistics.sk/mosmis/eng/run.html
http://www.e-obce.sk/obec/horna_micina/horna-micina.html
http://www.tourist-channel.sk/horna-micina/

Villages and municipalities in Banská Bystrica District